Chinese Taipei competed at the 2011 World Aquatics Championships in Shanghai, China between July 16 and 31, 2011.

Diving

Chinese Taipei has qualified 2 athletes in diving.

Women

Swimming

Chinese Taipei qualified 2 swimmers.

Men

Women

References

Nations at the 2011 World Aquatics Championships
2011 in Taiwanese sport
Chinese Taipei at the World Aquatics Championships